I Dream of Jeannie is an American fantasy sitcom starring Barbara Eden as a 2,000-year-old genie and Larry Hagman as an astronaut who becomes her master, with whom she falls in love and whom she eventually marries. Produced by Screen Gems, the series originally aired from September 1965 to May 1970 on NBC. The series ran for five seasons and produced 139 episodes. The first season consisted of 30 episodes filmed in black and white; all later seasons were filmed in color.

Series overview

Episodes

Season 1 (1965–66)
All first-season episodes were originally filmed in black and white, but were colorized subsequently for the Sony DVD releases and some syndication airings.

Note: The signature head-nod-and-blink with arms crossed in an uplifted pose indicates that Jeannie is invoking magic. (In some cases she leaves her arms unmoved.) For this article, we use the term "blink" to denote that her literal eye blink is associated with an act of magic.

Season 2 (1966–67)
All episodes from season 2 on were filmed in color.

Season 3 (1967–68)

Season 4 (1968–69)

Season 5 (1969–70)

TV movies

Notes

References

I Dream of Jeannie
Lists of American sitcom episodes